Duke of Nemours was a title in the Peerage of France. The name refers to Nemours in the Île-de-France region of north-central France.

History
In the 12th and 13th centuries, the Lordship of Nemours, in the Gatinais, France, was a possession of the house of Villebéon, a member of which, Gautier, was marshal of France in the middle of the 13th century. The lordship was sold to King Philip III of France in 1274 and 1276 by Jean and Philippe de Nemours. It was then made a county and given in 1364 to Jean III de Grailly, captal de Buch. 

In 1404, Charles VI of France gave it to Charles III of Navarre and elevated it into a duchy in the peerage of France, in exchange to his ancestral county of Évreux in Normandy.

After being confiscated and restored several times, the duchy reverted to the French crown in 1504, after the extinction of the house of Armagnac-Pardiac. In 1507, it was given by Louis XII of France to his nephew, Gaston de Foix, who was killed at the Battle of Ravenna in 1512.

The duchy then returned to the royal domain and was detached from it successively for Giuliano de Medici and his wife Philiberta of Savoy in 1515, for Louise of Savoy in 1524, and for Philip of Savoy, Count of Genevois, in 1528. The descendants of Philip of Savoy held the duchy until its sale to Louis XIV of France.

In 1672, Louis XIV gave it to his brother Philippe de France, Duke of Orléans, whose descendants held it until the French Revolution. It was one of the many subsidiary titles held by the House of Orléans. The title of Duke of Nemours was afterwards given to Louis Charles d'Orléans, the second son of King Louis Philippe of the French.

List of lords
House of Château-Landon
Orson (1120–1148)
Aveline (1148–1174), died 1196

Aveline married Walter of Villebéon, lord of Beaumont-du-Gâtinais, in 1150 and shared the lordship with him. They left it to their son in 1174.

House of Villebéon
Walter I [Gautier I] (1150–1174), died 1205
Philip I [Philippe I] (1174–1191)
Walter II [Gautier II] (1191–1222)
Philip II [Philippe II] (1222–1255)
Walter III [Gautier III] (1255–1270)
Philip III [Philippe III] (1270–1274)

The lordship was sold to the king in 1274.

List of dukes

House of Evreux (1404–1504) 

 Charles d'Évreux (1361–1425), also King of Navarre

After the death of Charles III in 1425, the Duchy was claimed both by the descendants of his younger daughter, Beatrice, and his elder daughter and heiress, Blanche I of Navarre.
Louis XI settled the claim on Jacques d'Armagnac, grandson of Beatrice, in 1462, though Blanche's descendants, the kings of Navarre, claimed the title until 1571.

 Eléanore de Bourbon (1425–c1462)
 Jacques d'Armagnac (1462–1477)
confiscated from Jacques at his execution for treason in 1477, restored to his son Jean in 1484
 Jean d'Armagnac (1484–1500)
 Louis d'Armagnac (1500–1503)
 Marguerite d'Armagnac (1503)
 Charlotte d'Armagnac (1503–1504)
The last descendant of Béatrix d'Évreux, she died without issue.

House of Foix (1507–1512) 

 Gaston of Foix (1507–1512)

House of Medici (1515–1524) 

 Giuliano de’ Medici (1515–1516), married to:
 Philiberte of Savoy (1516–1524)

House of Savoy (1524–1672) 

 Louise of Savoy (1524–1531), Duchess of Angoulême, Francis I of France's mother.

She received the duchy of Nemours in 1524 with the duchy of Anjou. It was later transferred to her half-brother in 1528 and she received the duchy of Touraine in exchange. She also received later the Duchy of Auvergne.

 Philip of Savoy (1528–1533)
 Jacques of Savoy (1531–1585)
 Charles Emmanuel of Savoy (1567–1595)
 Henry of Savoy (1572–1632)
 Louis of Savoy (1615–1641)
 Charles Amadeus of Savoy (1624–1652)
 Henry of Savoy (1625–1659)

House of Orléans (1672–1848) 

 Philippe de France (1640–1701)
 Philippe d'Orléans (1674–1723), Regent of France 1715–1723, son of the above
 Louis d'Orléans, Duke of Orléans (1703–1752), son of the above
 Louis Philippe d'Orléans (1725–1785), son of the above
 Philippe d'Orléans, Philippe Égalité (1747–1793), son of the above
 Louis Philippe d'Orléans (1773–1850), King of the French, 1830–1848, son of the above

Titular Dukes of the House of Orléans 

 Louis Charles d'Orléans (1850–1896), son of the above
 Charles Philippe d'Orléans (1905–1970), great-grandson of the above

Potential claimants of the House of Orléans-Braganza 
In 1909, members of the House of Orléans and the House of Orléans-Braganza signed the Pact of  Brussels (also known as the Declaration of Brussel), the Duke of Orléans being present. The dynastic pact created the title of Prince of Orléans-Braganza for the Count d'Eu and his descendants, thus maintaining the princely status of his house, although this is considered a house distinct from the Royal House of France, and the Count d'Eu did not in fact recover his former position in the line of Orleans succession to the French throne.

Under the Pact of Brussels the Count d'Eu and his sons equally undertook in his name and the name of his descendants not to contest in any way to the branch of the Duke d'Alençon the possession of the title of Duke of Nemours.

Nevertheless, Charles Philippe d'Orléans, the last Duke of Nemours and only descendent of the Alençon, died without heirs opening the theoretical possibility for the Head of the House of Orléans-Braganza to claim said title without violating the family fact.

List of duchesses
This is a list of the Duchesses of Nemours and their original houses.

House of Évreux

House of Medici

House of Savoy

House of Orléans

References 

 
House of Savoy
House of Orléans
Duchesses of Nemours
Lists of duchesses

fr:Liste des ducs de Nemours
nl:Lijst van hertogen van Nemours
pl:Władcy Nemours